Athletes from East Germany (German Democratic Republic, called DDR in the opening ceremony) competed at the 1972 Summer Olympics in Munich, West Germany. 297 competitors, 231 men and 66 women, took part in 161 events in 18 sports.

Medalists

Gold
 Peter Frenkel — Athletics, Men's 20 km Walk 
 Wolfgang Nordwig — Athletics, Men's Pole Vault 
 Renate Stecher — Athletics, Women's 100 metres
 Renate Stecher — Athletics, Women's 200 metres
 Monika Zehrt — Athletics, Women's 400 metres
 Annelie Ehrhardt — Athletics, Women's 100m Hurdles 
 Monika Zehrt, Dagmar Käsling, Rita Kühne, and Helga Seidler — Athletics, Women's 4 × 400 m Relay 
 Ruth Fuchs — Athletics, Women's Javelin Throw
 Siegbert Horn — Canoeing, Men's K1 Kayak Slalom Singles 
 Reinhard Eiben — Canoeing, Men's C1 Canadian Slalom Singles 
 Rolf-Dieter Amend and Walter Hofmann — Canoeing, Men's C2 Canadian Slalom Pairs 
 Angelika Bahmann — Canoeing, Women's K1 Kayak Slalom Singles
 Klaus Köste — Gymnastics, Men's Long Horse Vault
 Karin Janz — Gymnastics, Women's Side Horse Vault 
 Karin Janz — Gymnastics, Women's Asymmetrical Bars 
 Siegfried Brietzke and Wolfgang Mager — Rowing, Men's Coxless Pairs 
 Wolfgang Gunkel, Jörg Lucke, and Klaus-Dieter Neubert — Rowing, Men's Coxed Pairs 
 Dieter Schubert, Frank Forberger, Dieter Grahn and Frank Rühle — Rowing, Men's Coxless Fours 
 Roland Matthes — Swimming, Men's 100m Backstroke 
 Roland Matthes — Swimming, Men's 200m Backstroke

Silver
 Stefan Junge — Athletics, Men's High Jump 
 Jörg Drehmel — Athletics, Men's triple jump 
 Jochen Sachse — Athletics, Men's Hammer Throw 
 Gunhild Hoffmeister — Athletics, Women's 1500 metres
 Bärbel Struppert, Christina Heinich, Evelin Kaufer, and Renate Stecher — Athletics, Women's 4 × 100 m Relay 
 Margitta Gummel-Helmboldt — Athletics, Women's Shot Put 
 Jacqueline Todten — Athletics, Women's Javelin Throw
 Petra Grabowski and Ilse Kaschube — Canoeing, Women's K2 500m Kayak Pairs 
 Uwe Unterwalder, Thomas Huschke, Heinz Richter, and Herbert Richter — Cycling, Men's 4000m Team Pursuit 
 Jürgen Geschke and Werner Otto — Cycling, Men's 2000m Tandem 
 Karin Janz — Gymnastics, Women's All-Around Individual 
 Erika Zuchold — Gymnastics, Women's Side Horse Vault 
 Erika Zuchold — Gymnastics, Women's Asymmetrical Bars 
 Erika Zuchold, Richarda Schmeißer, Christine Schmitt, Irene Abel, Angelika Hellmann, and Karin Janz — Gymnastics, Women's Team Combined Exercises 
 Eckhard Martens, Dietrich Zander, Reinhard Gust, Rolf Jobst, and Klaus-Dieter Ludwig — Rowing, Men's Coxed Fours 
 Roland Matthes, Klaus Katzur, Hartmut Flöckner, and Lutz Unger — Swimming, Men's 4 × 100 m Medley Relay 
 Roswitha Beier — Swimming, Women's 100m Butterfly 
 Kornelia Ender — Swimming, Women's 200m Individual Medley 
 Gabriele Wetzko, Andrea Eife, Kornelia Ender, and Elke Sehmisch — Swimming, Women's 4 × 100 m Freestyle Relay 
 Christine Herbst, Renate Vogel, Roswitha Beier, and Kornelia Ender — Swimming, Women's 4 × 100 m Medley Relay 
 Rainer Tscharke, Wolfgang Webner, Wolfgang Weise, Siegfried Schneider, Arnold Schulz, Rudi Schumann, Jürgen Maune, Horst Peter, Eckehard Pietzsch, Horst Hagen, Wolfgang Löwe, and Wolfgang Maibohm — Volleyball, Men's Team Competition
 Heinz-Helmut Wehling — Wrestling, Men's Greco-Roman Featherweight 
 Paul Borowski, Karl-Heinz Thun and Konrad Weichert — Sailing, Men's Dragon Class

Bronze
 Hans-Georg Reimann — Athletics, Men's 20 km Walk 
 Hartmut Briesenick — Athletics, Men's Shot Put
 Gunhild Hoffmeister — Athletics, Women's 800 metres
 Karin Balzer — Athletics, Women's 100m Hurdles
 Burglinde Pollak — Athletics, Women's Pentathlon 
 Peter Tiepold — Boxing, Men's Light Middleweight
 Marina Janicke — Diving, Women's 3m Springboard
 Marina Janicke — Diving, Women's 10m Platform
 Harald Gimpel — Canoeing, Men's K1 Kayak Slalom Singles 
 Jürgen Schütze — Cycling, Men's 1000m Time Trial
 Jürgen Paeke, Reinhard Rychly, Wolfgang Thüne, Matthias Brehme, Wolfgang Klotz, and Klaus Köste — Gymnastics, Men's Team Combined Exercises 559.70 
 Karin Janz — Gymnastics, Women's Balance Beam 
 Dietmar Hötger — Judo, Men's Half Middleweight (70 kg)
 Wolfgang Güldenpfennig — Rowing, Men's Single Sculls 
 Joachim Böhmer and Hans-Ullrich Schmied — Rowing, Men's Double Sculls 
 Manfred Schneider, Hartmut Schreiber, Dietmar Schwarz, Jörg Landvoigt, Heinrich Mederow, Manfred Schmorde, Hans-Joachim Borzym, Harold Dimke, and Bernd Landvoigt — Rowing, Men's Rowing Eights 
 Werner Lippoldt — Shooting, Men's Small-bore Rifle, Three Positions
 Michael Buchheim — Shooting, Men's Skeet Shooting
 Konrad Weise, Manfred Zapf, Joachim Streich, Eberhard Vogel, Siegmar Wätzlich, Ralf Schulenberg, Wolfgang Seguin, Jürgen Sparwasser, Hans-Jürgen Kreische, Lothar Kurbjuweit, Jürgen Pommerenke, Frank Ganzera, Reinhard Häfner, Harald Irmscher, Bernd Bransch, Jürgen Croy, and Peter Ducke — Football (soccer), Men's Team Competition
 Lutz Unger, Peter Bruch, Wilfried Hartung, and Roland Matthes — Swimming, Men's 4 × 100 m Freestyle Relay 
 Gudrun Wegner — Swimming, Women's 400m Freestyle
 Stefan Grützner — Weightlifting, Men's Heavyweight
 Gerd Bonk — Weightlifting, Men's Super Heavyweight

Athletics

Men's 800 metres
Dieter Fromm
 Heat — 1:46.9
 Semifinals — 1:48.1
 Final — 1:48.0 (→ 8th place)

Men's 1500 metres
Klaus-Peter Justus
 Heat — 3:40.4
 Semifinals — 3:44.6 (→ did not advance)

Men's 4 × 100 m Relay
Manfred Kokot, Bernd Borth, Hans-Jörgen Bombach, and Siegfried Schenke
 Heat — 39.17s 
 Semifinals — 39.06s
 Final — 38.90s (→ 5th place)

Men's High Jump
Stefan Junge 
 Qualifying Round — 2.15m
 Final — 2.21m (→  Silver Medal)

Boxing

Men's Light Middleweight (– 71 kg)
Peter Tiepold →  Bronze Medal
 First Round — Bye
 Second Round — Defeated Ion Györfi (ROM), 4:1  
 Third Round — Defeated Mikko Saarinen (FIN), 5:0 
 Quarterfinals — Defeated Emeterio Villanueva (MEX), 5:0 
 Semifinals — Lost to Wiesław Rudkowski (POL), 1:4

Men's Heavyweight (+ 81 kg)
Jürgen Fanghänel
 First Round — Defeated Atanas Suvandzhiev (BUL), KO-1 
 Quarterfinals — Lost to Ion Alexe (ROM), 0:5

Canoeing

Cycling

Eleven cyclists represented East Germany in 1972.

Individual road race
 Karl-Heinz Oberfranz — 30th place
 Wolfgang Wesemann — 33rd place
 Dieter Gonschorek — did not finish (→ no ranking)
 Wolfram Kühn — did not finish (→ no ranking)

Sprint
 Hans-Jürgen Geschke
 Werner Otto

1000m time trial
 Jürgen Schütze
 Final — 1:07.02 (→  Bronze Medal)

Tandem
 Jürgen Geschke and Werner Otto —  Silver Medal

Individual pursuit
 Thomas Huschke

Team pursuit
 Thomas Huschke
 Heinz Richter
 Herbert Richter
 Uwe Unterwalder

Diving

Men's 3m Springboard:
 Falk Hoffmann — 544.95 points (→ 7th place)
 Helge Ziethen — 511.02 points (→ 12th place)

Men's 10m Platform:
 Lothar Matthes — 465.75 points (→ 4th place)
 Falk Hoffmann — 436.71 points (→ 10th place)
 Wolfram Ristau — 268.59 points (→ 23rd place)

Women's 3m Springboard:
 Marina Janicke — 430.92 points (→  Bronze Medal)
 Heidi Becker — 405.78 points (→ 9th place) 
 Christa Köhler — 394.20 points (→ 11th place)

Women's 10m Platform:
 Marina Janicke — 360.54 points (→  Bronze Medal)
 Sylvia Fiedler — 341.67 points (→ 6th place)

Equestrian

Fencing

Five fencers, all men, represented East Germany in 1972.

Men's épée
 Horst Melzig
 Bernd Uhlig
 Hans-Peter Schulze

Men's team épée
 Harry Fiedler, Eckhard Mannischeff, Horst Melzig, Hans-Peter Schulze, Bernd Uhlig

Football

Gymnastics

Handball

Men's Team Competition
As expected, the East Germans dominated the first round, defeating Iceland, Tunisia, and Czechoslovakia in turn to win their division.  The second round began with a loss to the Soviet Union.  Czechoslovakia's wins over the Soviet Union and Sweden meant that the East Germans had to defeat Sweden as well just to tie the Czechoslovakian team in the standings, which they did.  However, the tie-breaker went against the East Germans and they placed second in the division.  They played the other division's second place team, Romania in the bronze medal game and lost, receiving fourth place.

Preliminary Round (Group B)
 East Germany – Iceland 16-11 (7-6) 
 East Germany – Tunisia 21-9 (11-2) 
 East Germany – Czechoslovakia 14-12 (5-4) 
Second Round (Group A)
 East Germany – Soviet Union 8-11 (4-4) 
 East Germany – Sweden 14-11 (8-6) 
Bronze Medal Game
 East Germany – Romania 16-19 (8-11) → 4th place
Team Roster
Harry Zörnack
Horst Jankhöfer
Josef Rose  
Jürgen Hildebrand 
Klaus Langhoff 
Klaus Weiß 
Peter Larisch   
Peter Randt  
Rainer Würdig 
Rainer Zimmermann 
Reiner Frieske  
Reiner Ganschow 
Siegfried Voigt  
Udo Röhrig  
Wolfgang Böhme  
Wolfgang Lakenmacher

Judo

Rowing

Men's single sculls
Wolfgang Güldenpfennig
Heat — 7:46.31
Repechage — 8:05.19
Semi Finals — 8:16.35 
Final — 7:14.45 (→  Bronze medal)

Men's double sculls
Joachim Böhmer
Uli Schmied

Men's coxless pair
Siegfried Brietzke
Wolfgang Mager

Men's coxed pair
Wolfgang Gunkel, Jörg Lucke and Klaus-Dieter Neubert
Heat — 7:54.11
Semi Finals — 8:13.87
Final — 7:17.25 (→  Gold medal)

Men's coxless four
Frank Forberger
Dieter Grahn
Frank Rühle
Dieter Schubert

Men's coxed four
Dietrich Zander
Reinhard Gust
Eckhard Martens
Rolf Jobst
Klaus-Dieter Ludwig

Men's eight
Hans-Joachim Borzym
Jörg Landvoigt
Harold Dimke
Manfred Schneider
Hartmut Schreiber
Manfred Schmorde
Bernd Landvoigt
Heinrich Mederow
Dietmar Schwarz

Sailing

Shooting

Nine male shooters represented East Germany in 1972. Werner Lippoldt won bronze in the 50 m rifle, three positions and Michael Buchheim won bronze in the skeet.

25 m pistol
 Christian Düring

50 m pistol
 Harald Vollmar

300 m rifle, three positions
 Uto Wunderlich
 Werner Lippoldt

50 m rifle, three positions
 Werner Lippoldt
 Uto Wunderlich

50 m rifle, prone
 Werner Lippoldt
 Peter Gorewski

Trap
 Burckhardt Hoppe
 Manfred Geisler

Skeet
 Michael Buchheim
 Klaus Reschke

Swimming

Men's 100m Freestyle
Peter Bruch
 Heat — 54.25s
 Semifinals — 53.97s (→ did not advance)
Wilfried Härtung
 Heat — 54.37s (→  did not advance)
Hartmut Flöckner
 Heat — 54.36s (→  did not advance)

Men's 200m Freestyle
Wilfried Härtung
 Heat — 1:56.95 (→  did not advance)
Udo Poser
 Heat — 1:57.23 (→  did not advance)
Peter Bruch
 Heat — 1:58.49 (→  did not advance)

Men's 4 × 100 m Freestyle Relay
Wilfried Härtung, Peter Bruch, Udo Poser and Lutz Unger
 Heat — 3:35.13 
Roland Matthes, Wilfried Härtung, Peter Bruch, and Lutz Unger
 Final — 3:32.42 (→  Bronze Medal)

Men's 4 × 200 m Freestyle Relay
Wilfried Härtung, Udo Poser, Roger Pyttel and Lutz Unger
 Heat — 7:51.11
Wilfried Härtung, Peter Bruch, Udo Poser, and Lutz Unger
 Final — 7:49.11 (→ 6th place)

Volleyball

Men's Team Competition
Preliminary Round (Group B)
 Defeated Cuba (3-0)
 Defeated Brazil (3-1)
 Lost to Japan (0-3)
 Defeated West Germany (3-0)
 Defeated Romania (3-0)
Semifinals
 Defeated Soviet Union (3-1)
Final
 Lost to Japan (1-3) →  Silver Medal
Team Roster
Siggi Schneider 
Arnold Schulz 
Wolfgang Webner 
Eckhardt Pietzsch 
Rudi Schumann 
Wolfgang Weise 
Horst Hagen 
Horst Peter 
Wolfgang Löwe 
Rainer Tscharke 
Wolf Maibohn
Jürgen Maune

Weightlifting

Wrestling

References

Germany, East
1972
Summer Olympics
1972 in German sport